Sergio García Sepúlveda (born 3 March 1963) is a Mexican politician from the National Action Party. From 2000 to 2003 he served as Deputy of the LVIII Legislature of the Mexican Congress representing Jalisco.

References

1963 births
Living people
Politicians from Jalisco
Members of the Chamber of Deputies (Mexico)
National Action Party (Mexico) politicians
21st-century Mexican politicians